Timocrates may refer to:
"Against Timocrates", a speech by Demosthenes
Timocrates of Syracuse, husband to Arete (daughter of Dionysius)
Timocrates of Rhodes, (4th century BC) a Rhodian Greek opposed to Sparta
Timocrates of Lampsacus, (3rd century BC) disciple of Epicurus, but who later became his enemy